Garra chebera is a species of ray-finned fish in the genus Garra. It is endemic to the Dildil Stream in Ethiopia.

References 

Endemic fauna of Ethiopia
Garra
Fish described in 2010